The 1st (Silesian) Life Cuirassiers were a heavy cavalry regiment of the Royal Prussian Army. The regiment was originally formed as Dragoon Guards in 1674 and reorganized as a cuirassiers unit in 1718. The regiment fought in the Silesian Wars and the War of the Sixth Coalition 1813-15, the Austro-Prussian War, the Franco-Prussian War and World War I. The regiment was disbanded in 1919.

Between 1815 and 1863, its commander was Prince Frederick of Prussia (1794–1863).

See also
List of Imperial German cavalry regiments

References

Cuirassiers of the Prussian Army
Military units and formations established in 1674
Military units and formations disestablished in 1919
1674 establishments in Prussia
1919 disestablishments in Germany